Xun Fangying and You Xiaodi were the defending champions, but both players chose not to participate.

Han Xinyun and Zhu Lin won the title after defeating Jacqueline Cako and Julia Glushko 7–5, 6–1 in the final.

Seeds

Draw

References
Main Draw

Zhengzhou Women's Tennis Open - Doubles